"Banned in the U.S.A." is a song recorded by the American hip hop group 2 Live Crew. It was released in May 1990 as the lead single from their fourth album of the same name. "Banned in the U.S.A." was also released on the alternate version of the album, credited as Luke's debut solo album, titled The Luke LP. The song peaked at number 20 on the U.S. Billboard Hot 100 chart and is the group's highest-charting song on that chart. It also reached number-one on the U.S. Billboard Hot Rap Tracks chart.

Content
The song is a reference to the decision in a court case that the 2 Live Crew's album As Nasty as They Wanna Be was obscene. (The decision would later be overturned on appeal.) It contains a sample of a Ronald Reagan impressionist proclaiming the United States' government to be a government "Of the people, for the people, by the people."

Charts

References

Political rap songs
1990 singles
2 Live Crew songs
Luther Campbell songs
1990 songs
Atlantic Records singles
Luke Records singles